Ermengarde (died 1283) was the ruling suo jure Duchess of Limburg from 1279 to 1283. She was the daughter of Judith of Kleve and Waleran IV, Duke of Limburg. She was named after her paternal grandmother.

It is possible she was the only child of her parents, but is also equally possible she had a younger sister, Sophia.

Ermengarde married count Reginald I of Guelders, but they were childless. Ermengarde died in 1283. The Duchy of Limburg was added into the Duchy of Brabant after her husband was defeated in the Battle of Worringen in 1288.

References

Dukes of Limburg
1283 deaths
Year of birth unknown
13th-century women rulers